John Ryan (9 September 1934 – 17 May 1989) fought the silver medalist Akio Kaminaga in the 1964 Tokyo Summer Olympics for Ireland in the open class judo competition.

References

1934 births
1989 deaths
Judoka at the 1964 Summer Olympics
Living people
Olympic judoka of Ireland